is a city located in Fukui Prefecture, Japan. ,  the city had an estimated population of 33,640 in 11,747 households and the population density of 39 persons per km2. The town is encircled by a ring of mountains and the only way in or out is via tunnels or mountain roads.

Geography
Ōno is located in mountainous northeastern Fukui Prefecture, bordered by Ishikawa Prefecture to the north and Gifu Prefecture to the east and south. The city is geographically the largest municipality in Fukui Prefecture, occupying one fifth of the prefecture's territory. The Kuzuryū River flows through the city. Parts of the city are within the  borders of Hakusan National Park.

Neighbouring municipalities 
Fukui Prefecture
Katsuyama
Fukui
Ikeda
Ishikawa Prefecture
Hakusan
Gifu Prefecture
Takayama
Gujō
Seki
Motosu
Ibigawa

Climate
Ōno has a Humid climate (Köppen Cfa) characterized by warm, wet summers and cold winters with heavy snowfall.

Demographics
Per Japanese census data, the population of Ōno has declined over the past 50 years.

History
Ōno is part of ancient Echizen Province. During the Edo period, Ōno developed as the castle town of Ōno Domain. Following the Meiji restoration, it was organised into part of Ōno District in Fukui Prefecture. Much of the old town of Ōno was destroyed in a fire on April 8, 1888. With the establishment of the modern municipalities system on April 1, 1889. the town of Ōno was established. Ōno merged with the villages of Shimosho, Kamisho, Goka, Sakadani, Tomida, Inuigawa and Oyama and was raised to city status on July 1, 1954. Ōno annexed the neighbouring village of Nishitani on July 1, 1970. On November 7, 2005, the village of Izumi was merged into Ōno. Ōno and the surroundings were the setting for the 2011 non-fiction book For Fukui's Sake, written by a British author who resided there for two years.

Government
Ōno has a mayor-council form of government with a directly elected mayor and a unicameral city legislature of 18 members.

Economy
The economy of Ōno is mixed, with agriculture, forestry  and seasonal tourism playing prominent roles.

Education
Ōno has ten public elementary schools and five middle schools operated by the city government, and two public high schools operated by the Fukui Prefectural Board of Education.

Transportation

Railway
  JR West - Etsumi-Hoku Line
  -  -  -  -  -  -  -  -  -

Highway
E67 Chubu-Jukan Expressway

International relations 
 - Ningbo, Zhejiang, China, friendship city

Local attractions
Hakusan National Park
Ōno Castle (Echizen Province)

References

External links 

  
 

 
Cities in Fukui Prefecture